Matthes is a German surname.  Notable people with the surname include:

Agneta Matthes (1847–1909), Dutch entrepreneur
Heinrich Matthes (born 1902), German SS-Scharführer
Josef Friedrich Matthes (1886–1943), head of the Rhenish Republic
Klaus Matthes (1931–1998), German mathematician
Lothar Matthes (born 1947), German diver
Marion Charles Matthes (1906–1980), United States federal judge
Michael Matthes, French organist
Paul Matthes (1879–1948), German footballer
Roland Matthes (1950–2019), German backstroke swimmer
Ruthie Matthes (born 1965), American bicycle racer
Sven Matthes (born 1969), German sprinter
Ulrich Matthes (born 1959), German actor

German-language surnames
Surnames from given names